The El Salvador national tennis team represents El Salvador in Davis Cup tennis competition and are governed by the Federación Salvadorena de Ténis.

El Salvador currently competes in the Americas Zone of Group II.  They have reached Group II on four occasions, and won their first ever Group II match in April 2007 to avoid relegation.

History
El Salvador competed in its first Davis Cup in 1991.

Current team (2022)

 Marcelo Arévalo
 César Cruz
 Lluis Miralles
 Diego Durán
 Kyle Johnson

See also
Davis Cup
El Salvador Fed Cup team

External links

Davis Cup teams
Davis Cup
Davis Cup